Wempletown is an unincorporated community in Winnebago County, Illinois, United States.

Notes

Unincorporated communities in Winnebago County, Illinois
Unincorporated communities in Illinois